Over the top may refer to:

Music
 "Over the Top", a 2017 song by Hey! Say! JUMP 
 Over the Top (Cozy Powell album), 1979 album by British drummer Cozy Powell
 Over the Top (Infinite album), 2011 album by South Korean band Infinite
 Over the Top (Mentors album), 2005 album by American band Mentors
 Over the Top (White Wizzard album), 2010 album by the American band White Wizzard 
 Over the Top: The Rarities, 2000 album by the band Motörhead
"Over the Top: Military March", 1917 World War I song
"Over the Top" (1917 song), 1917 World War I song 
"Over the Top", an album by Mountain (1995)
"Over the Top", a song by Battle Beast, on the album Battle Beast (2013)
"Over the Top", a song by Motörhead, on the album Bomber (1979)
"Over the Top", a song by Pete Townshend, on the album The Iron Man: The Musical by Pete Townshend (1989)
"Over the Top", a song by Raven, on the album Rock Until You Drop (1981)
"Over the Top"  (Led Zeppelin song), an alternate title for the Led Zeppelin instrumental "Moby Dick"
"Over the Top" (Smiley song), released in 2021

Film and television
 Over-the-top media service, content providers that distribute streaming media as a standalone product directly to viewers over the Internet, bypassing traditional platforms
 Over the Top (1918 film), film based on 1917 book of same name, by Arthur Guy Empey
 Over the Top (1987 film), an action drama film starring Sylvester Stallone
 Over the Top (TV series), a 1997 TV series starring Tim Curry and Steve Carell
 "Over The Top", an episode of Regular Show
 Big Brother: Over the Top, a digital spin-off series of the U.S. version of Big Brother

Other
 "Going over the top", a military phrase derived from the trench warfare of the First World War
Over the Top Cube, 17x17x17 former world record largest Rubik's Cube invented by Oskar van Deventer
Over the Top, a sculpture copyrighted in 1921 by John Paulding, depicting a World War I infantryman and used in several war memorials across the United States
Over the Top (painting), a painting of an assault during World War I of the First Artists Rifles in 1916 by the war artist John Nash
Over the Top Wrestling, Irish wrestling promotion
Over the Top, 2019 memoir by Jonathan Van Ness